Scott Shannon's True Oldies Channel (also known more recently as The True Oldies Channel: Greatest Hits) is a radio network begun in the spring of 2004. Originally distributed by ABC Radio Networks via satellite, the service plays a hybrid oldies/classic hits format comprising music mostly from 1964 to 1979 but also plays selected cuts from the 1955-1963 era and also from the 1980s. As of September 22, 2016, it is distributed via United Stations Radio Networks.

Prior to June 30, 2014; the service had over 100 affiliate stations across the United States. The service is available 24 hours a day online. Some stations ran the format full-time 24/7 while a few others ran it on overnights only. Many member stations, however, generally break away from the program feed at some points during the day to air some local programming, either a local morning show, a local afternoon show, or both; Cumulus also offered Imus in the Morning for The True Oldies Channel affiliates.

Scott Shannon was the founder, namesake and sole on-air personality (heard at all hours through voice-tracking) at the True Oldies Channel from its founding until he departed Cumulus Media (which had acquired Citadel Broadcasting in 2011, the company that in turn had bought ABC's radio assets in 2007) in February 2014. Weekend and guest hosts included Robby Bridges, Blake Hayes, Jay Michaels and Beaver Cleaver. In March 2014, Westwood One, the service's syndicator, announced it was canceling distribution of the channel at the end of June 2014, with no exact date announced, and planned to replace the service with "Good Time Oldies," a brand previously used by Jones Radio Networks as recently as the mid-2000s. Shannon confirmed the news through the network's Facebook page, but said the network and format is still available for streaming online. Shannon also hinted the possibility of "The True Oldies Channel" returning to the radio airwaves soon. It was unknown at the time who the network's new distributor would be, although SkyView Networks (which is also taking over distribution of ABC's other radio programs in 2015) was a possible candidate, as was United Stations Radio Networks, which teamed with Shannon for a syndicated program slated to air in November 2014.

On September 22, 2016, Scott Shannon and the United Stations Radio Networks struck a deal to relaunch radio syndication of the True Oldies Channel. A handful of radio affiliates, including WZTI in Milwaukee, Wisconsin were test-subjects for the new cloud based distribution created by Synchronicity before the nationwide reinstatement.

Evolution
At the time of the station's launch (a time when "real oldies" was experiencing a certain degree of revival on the AM dial), the True Oldies Channel featured only music from 1955 to 1969 with less than ten percent from 1970 to 1973 (for example "Tears of a Clown" and "Burning Love"). The format was 60% 1964 to 1969 (the post-British Invasion era) and 40% 1955 to 1963 (the pre-British Invasion rock and roll/doo-wop era). It was the network's original mission to avoid the trends of other oldies outlets and remain committed to the music produced from the beginning of the rock-and-roll era to the disco era (1955 to 1979), purposefully drawing the line of what they would (originally) never air at 1980. By 2005, oldies from the early 1970s were added in moderation, while the pre-1964 material was cut back slightly. In 2006, more late 1970s music was added and the pre-1964 songs were cut down to 2 or 3 per hour. In March 2008, the pre-1964 music was cut down to one song per hour during the day and twice an hour on overnights; and the hits from the late-1960s and early- to mid-1970s was played in equal amounts. A few 1980s cuts were also added.

On July 7, 2008, The True Oldies Channel further modified its format, dropping all but a couple pre-1964 titles and added a large amount of music from the 1980s, playing a couple per hour. The format was then more of a Classic Hits format and was oldies in name only. This change was very short lived and by the end of July they backed off the 1980s music and by August most 1980s' music was gone. A moderate amount of pre-1964 material was also reinstated.

The network's original ban on 1980s music no longer is enforced; songs such as "Take Me Home Tonight" by Eddie Money from 1986  and "Into the Night" by Benny Mardones (1980) occasionally are played on the network. The network now focuses its branding on variety, admitting they too have followed trends toward newer music, but also making sure to retain some of the older music that most oldies stations have abandoned. The majority of the network's programming remains 1960s music, with 1970s music more prominent than it was in the beginning. 1950s and 1980s music are currently played sporadically, less than once an hour; as of the 2014 online revival, Shannon acknowledges the addition of “a few (songs) tossed in from the 80s.”

Growth
The True Oldies format had experienced significant growth in exposure following cost-cutting measures across Citadel's payroll since the company's acquisition of ABC Radio Networks (and some of its O&O stations) from Disney. Lower performing stations owned by Citadel Broadcasting, such as WYAY (now K-Love owned & operated WAKL) Atlanta, were switched over to True Oldies, sometimes with Imus in the Morning as the morning show. WLS-FM Chicago, however, only ran True Oldies Channel overnights and weekends with a similar local oldies format weekdays.

Affiliates
The following is a list of affiliates that previously aired The True Oldies Channel before Cumulus distribution cut-off on June 30, 2014.
 Abilene, Texas: KFGL
 Atlanta, Georgia: W255CJ (Low power FM simulcasting an HD Radio digital subchannel)
 Austin, Texas: KXBT (Monday-Friday overnights; Saturday Midnight-7AM; Sunday 7PM-6AM)
 Bainbridge, Georgia: WMGR
 Belle Glade, Florida: WBGF (as of New Year's Day, 2017)
 Beloit, Wisconsin: WGEZ
 Bemidji, Minnesota: WQXJ
 Bozeman, Montana: KOBB-FM
 Chambersburg, Pennsylvania: WCHA
 Chariton, Iowa: KEDB
 Clemson, South Carolina: WAHT
 Clewiston, Florida: WAFC
 Davenport, Iowa (Quad Cities): KJOC (Switched to All Sports format on May 1, 2014; callsign changed 2 months later)
 Evansville, Indiana: WSJD
 Fairbury, Nebraska: KGMT
 Fargo, North Dakota: KQWB
 Farragut, Tennessee/Sweetwater, Tennessee: WMTY (AM)/WMTY-FM (FM-Sunday begins at 10 PM)
 Georgetown, South Carolina: WPIF
 Grafton, North Dakota: KAUJ
 Hagerstown, Maryland: WHAG
 Houston, Texas: KRBE-HD2
 Huntsville, Alabama: WLOR
 Hudson, Wisconsin: WDGY
 Jamestown, New York: WKSN
 Jesup, Georgia: WIFO-FM (Weekends)
 Johnstown, Pennsylvania: WCCL
 Jupiter, Florida: WJBW
 Keaau, Hawaii: KBGX
 Lagrange, Georgia: WTRP
 Ladysmith, Wisconsin: WJBL
 Logan, Ohio: WLGN
 Ludington, Michigan: WKLA
 Manistee, Michigan: WMTE-FM
 Marysville, Ohio: WQTT (formerly WUCO)
 Munising, Michigan: WQXO
 New York, New York: WCBS-HD3 (HD Radio)
 Newton, North Carolina: WNNC
 Oxford, Alabama: WVOK (AM)
 Oklahoma City, Oklahoma: KZLS
 Pipestone/Marshall/Worthington, MN/Sioux Falls, SD: KISD (Overnights & Weekends)
 Piqua, Ohio: WPTW
 Pocatello, Idaho: KSEI
 Poughkeepsie, New York: WEOK
 Reading, Pennsylvania: WRAW
 Ridgefield / Danbury, Connecticut: WAXB
 Scranton, Pennsylvania: WARM
 Spring Hill, Florida (Tampa market): WGHR
 Stevens Point / Wausau, Wisconsin: WSPT-FM
 Tuscaloosa, Alabama: WJRD
 Denmark-Green Bay, Wisconsin: WGBW
 Waynesboro, Tennessee: WWON
 Wichita, Kansas: KLIO
 Utica, New York (Herkimer): WNRS

See also
Classic Hits
Timeless

References

External links
 The True Oldies Channel

Radio formats
American radio networks
Radio stations established in 2004
Former subsidiaries of The Walt Disney Company